The first round of the 2007–08 UEFA Cup began on 20 September 2007, which narrowed clubs down to 40 teams in preparation for the group stage.

Summary

|-
!colspan="5"|Group 1

|-
!colspan="5"|Group 2

|-
!colspan="5"|Group 3

|-
!colspan="5"|Group 4

|-
!colspan="5"|Group 5

|-
!colspan="5"|Group 6

|-
!colspan="5"|Group 7

|-
!colspan="5"|Group 8

|}

1 This match was played at Panthessaliko Stadium in Volos because AEL's Alcazar Stadium did not meet UEFA standards.

First leg

Second leg

Panathinaikos won 5–1 on aggregate.

Nürnberg 2–2 Rapid București on aggregate. Nürnberg won on away goals.

Tottenham Hotspur won 7–2 on aggregate.

Lokomotiv Moscow won 5–1 on aggregate.

Helsingborg won 8–6 on aggregate.

Atlético Madrid won 9–0 on aggregate.

Hamburg won 4–1 on aggregate.

Zürich won 4–2 on aggregate.

Austria Wien won 4–2 on aggregate.

Dinamo București 2–2 Elfsborg on aggregate. Elfsborg won on away goals.

Aberdeen 1–1 Dnipro Dnipropetrovsk on aggregate. Aberdeen won on away goals.

Toulouse 1–1 CSKA Sofia on aggregate. Toulouse won on away goals.

2–2 on aggregate. AaB won on away goals.

Spartak Moscow won 8–1 on aggregate.

Sparta Prague 0–0 Odense on aggregate. Sparta Prague won 4–3 on penalties.

Basel won 8–1 on aggregate.

Dinamo Zagreb 3–3 Ajax on aggregate. Dinamo Zagreb won on away goals.

Villarreal won 6–1 on aggregate.

Panionios won 2–1 on aggregate.

Zenit Saint Petersburg won 4–1 on aggregate.

Copenhagen won 3–2 on aggregate.

AEK Athens won 3–1 on aggregate.

Hapoel Tel Aviv won 1–0 on aggregate.

Brann 2–2 Club Brugge on aggregate. Brann won on away goals.

Bayern Munich won 3–0 on aggregate.

Galatasaray won 7–4 on aggregate.

Everton won 4–3 on aggregate.

Getafe 3–3 Twente on aggregate. Getafe won on away goals.

Red Star Belgrade won 2–0 on aggregate.

Rennes won 4–3 on aggregate.

Palermo 1–1 Mladá Boleslav on aggregate. Mladá Boleslav won 4–2 on penalties.

Anderlecht won 2–1 on aggregate.

Fiorentina 2–2 Groningen on aggregate. Fiorentina won 4–3 on penalties.

Bolton Wanderers won 2–1 on aggregate.

Aris 2–2 Real Zaragoza on aggregate. Aris won on away goals.

AEL won 3–2 on aggregate.

Bordeaux won 4–3 on aggregate.

AZ won 1–0 on aggregate.

Braga won 5–2 on aggregate.

Bayer Leverkusen won 5–4 on aggregate.

External links
Qualifying Rounds Information

Qualifying
September 2007 sports events in Europe
October 2007 sports events in Europe
UEFA Cup qualifying rounds